Local elections were held in Cavite on May 9, 2016, as part of the 2016 general election. Voters will select candidates for all local positions: a town mayor, vice mayor and town councilors, as well as members of the Sangguniang Panlalawigan, the vice-governor, governor and representatives for the seven districts of Cavite. Originally, incumbent Governor Jonvic Remulla was set running for his final term under Partido Magdalo and supported by the Estrada-Binay-led (and Aquino's administration opposition party) United Nationalist Alliance along with Vice-Governor Jolo Revilla, however, he later dropped out and was replaced by his brother Jesus Crispin Remulla, who ran solo instead.

Background
Their rivals, who belong to the Liberal Party, will not be fielding a candidate for the gubernatorial post.  The party's 2013 standard-bearer Ayong Maliksi is said to be no longer running as he would instead concentrate on being the chairperson of the Philippine Charity Sweepstakes Office.  It initially offered 7th District Representative Abraham "Bambol" Tolentino the party's gubernatorial slot, but talks stopped when the incumbent (Remulla) talked to Maliksi, who in turn promised his former vice governor that his party will not field a candidate for the governorship, thus making Remulla virtually unopposed for his third and final term (his opponent is perennial Cavite candidate Gerbie Berado).  Tolentino will instead run for re-election for his district seat.

However, LP considered who among 5th District (CarSiGMA) Representative Roy Loyola or 6th District Representative Luis "Jonjon" Ferrer IV as their vice gubernatorial bet upon consultation, opposing the younger Revilla.  4th District (Dasmariñas) Representative Elpidio Barzaga's name was under consideration for the vice governorship, but instead filed his candidacy for city mayor, where he will switch positions with his wife, Jennifer Austria-Barzaga, Pidi will oppose by a 23 year old Jigz Padillo which support Sen. Grace Poe.

In the end, LP will instead field 7th district board member Irene De Padua-Bencito as its vice gubernatorial candidate.  She will be supported by some of Cavite's political clans, among others, the Maliksis, Barzagas and Loyolas.

On December 9, 2015, Cavite Governor Jonvic Remulla said he will withdrawing his candidacy for re-election to pursue post graduate studies. His brother, Jesus Crispin "Boying" Remulla will substitute for him.  Sources also say that Boying Remulla will not support the vice gubernatorial bid of Jolo Revilla and will instead go solo, however Revilla seen on Binay campaign rally in Cavite City on February 11, 2016, as Binay will appoint Jonvic as Department of the Interior and Local Government Secretary if Binay become president.

On February 27, 2016, Jolo Revilla (and Remulla brothers) endorses Sen. Bongbong Marcos as their vice-presidential candidate (although him, he is still remained as a "running mate" of PRP's presidential candidate Sen. Miriam Defensor Santiago.) And the Revilla's support Grace Poe as president.

Candidates
Incumbents are expressed in italics.

Governor
Incumbent Jonvic Remulla originally intended to run for his third and final term. However, he withdrew his candidacy. His brother, former 7th District Representative Jesus Crispin Remulla, substituted him.

Vice-Governor
Vice Governor Jolo Revilla (Lakas–CMD) ran against 7th District Board Member Irene Bencito, Eddie De Asis & Severina Saulog. Although listed as an independent, Bencito was supported by the local Liberal and Nacionalista parties.

Congressional Elections

1st District Northern Cavite

2nd District (Bacoor)
Incumbent Lani Mercado-Revilla is running for Mayor of Bacoor. Her brother-in-law, incumbent Bacoor Mayor Strike Revilla, is her party's nominee.

3rd District (Imus)
Incumbent Representative Alex Advincula ran unopposed.

4th District (Dasmariñas)
Incumbent Elpidio Barzaga, Jr. is term-limited and is running for mayor of Dasmariñas. His wife, incumbent Mayor Jennifer Barzaga, is his party's nominee.

5th District (Carsigma)
Running on his last term under Liberal Party, incumbent Rep. Roy Loyola ran against former Silang Mayor Ruben Madlansacay under Nacionalista Party.

6th District (Cavite Central)
Luis "Jon-Jon" Ferrer IV ran unopposed as district representative.

7th District (Cavite Southwest)

Incumbent Congressman Abraham Tolentino ran unopposed.

Provincial Board Elections

First District (Cavite North)
City: Cavite City
Municipality: Kawit, Noveleta, Rosario

|-bgcolor=black
|colspan=5|

Second District (Lone District of Bacoor)
City: Bacoor

Voters of the city elected two board members at-large, regardless of whether these voters are from Bacoor West or Bacoor East (the city's city council districts).  Incumbent board member Edralin "Aba" Gawaran, who was nationally known as one of the right-hand men of detained Senator Ramon "Bong" Revilla Jr. when he was arrested and taken to jail for corruption charges in 2014 in connection with the PDAF scam, will vie for re-election. His partner for the other slot within Team Revilla was outgoing city councilor Reynaldo Fabian. They were opposed by former three-term municipal councilor Peter Simon Lara, transport operator and businessperson Neil Ragasa, and Rosalina Francisco.

Remulla, the other incumbent board member, is running for mayor.

|-bgcolor=black
|colspan=5|

Third District (Lone District of Imus)
City: Imus

Voters of the city will elect two board members at-large.

Due to the forged alliance between the Liberal Party, United Nationalist Alliance-Partido Magdalo, and Lakas–CMD, the "ONE IMUS" coalition was launched in October 2015. Incumbent Larry Boy Nato and former Imus mayor Homer Saquilayan ran for the district's two board seats under the said coalition.

Only the 3rd district has two unopposed candidates for representation in the provincial board.

Fourth District (Lone District of Dasmariñas)
City: Dasmariñas

|-bgcolor=black
|colspan=5|

Fifth District (Carsigma)
Municipality: Carmona, General Mariano Alvarez, Silang

|-bgcolor=black
|colspan=5|

Sixth District (Cavite Central)
City: General Trias, Trece Martires
Municipality: Amadeo, Tanza

Current BM Felix Grepo stands to run for reelection this year.

|-bgcolor=black
|colspan=5|

Seventh District (Cavite Southwest)
City: Tagaytay
Municipality: Alfonso, General Emilio Aguinaldo, Indang, Magallanes, Maragondon, Mendez, Naic, Ternate

|-bgcolor=black
|colspan=5|

Mayoral Election

First District

Cavite City
Incumbent Mayor Bernardo "Totie" Paredes sought for re-election for his fifth non-consecutive term.  His opponent was then-vice mayor Percilito "Penchie" Consigo.  They were partners in the 2013 election and were only estranged in the weeks leading to the filing of certificates of candidacy. Meanwhile, City Councilor Denver Chua ran for Vice Mayor under Mayor Paredes' ticket. He ran against barangay captain Obet de Leon under the Liberal Party ticket.

Kawit

Cousins Paul Plaridel Abaya and Angelo Emilio Aguinaldo are running for mayor.  The former is the incumbent vice mayor and brother of Secretary Joseph Emilio Abaya and Representative Francis "Blue" Abaya, while the latter, the perceived preferred candidate of Partido Magdalo in Kawit, is an incumbent councilor and son of third-term Mayor Reynaldo "Tik" Aguinaldo.

Noveleta
Three-termer outgoing mayor Enrico "Boy" Alvarez has agreed to the request of Governor Jonvic Remulla to field a common candidate for the UNA-Partido Magdalo Coalition in Noveleta, Cavite. Because of this "One Cavite" project of the governor, Mayor Boy Alvarez endorsed former vice mayor and incumbent provincial board member Dino Reyes Chua to be his successor as mayor of Noveleta. Meanwhile, his younger brother, Noveleta incumbent vice mayor Davey Reyes Chua, is supposedly running for provincial board member to replace his elder brother, who is running for Noveleta mayor. But the governor has committed the party slot for another candidate which made him decide to give way and just run for re-election as municipal councilor of Noveleta to support the mayoral bid of his brother. The Reyes-Chua Brothers came from the Reyes Clan of Noveleta. The legacy of the Reyes Clan started with the late Mayor Librado Reyes and Mayor Pepe Reyes (father and son) who both served as Noveleta mayors during the 1950s and 1980s respectively.

Rosario

Incumbent Mayor Jose "Nonong" Ricafrente is term-limited and will switch positions with his son, incumbent Vice Mayor Voltaire Ricafrente, who in turn will be opposed by former mayor and incumbent provincial administrator Renato Abutan.

Nonong Ricafrente, in turn, will be opposed by his former vice mayor Jose Rozel Hernandez.

Second District

Bacoor

Incumbent Edwin "Strike" Revilla is already in his third term as mayor of Bacoor; therefore he is disqualified from running for another term for the same position despite Bacoor's change in status as a city in 2012. He will be running for representative to switch positions with his sister-in-law, Lani Mercado-Revilla. Her opponents are former municipal vice mayor and provincial board member Edwin Malvar and incumbent provincial board member Rolando "Andoy" Remulla.

Incumbent vice mayor Catherine Sariño-Evaristo will be Representative Mercado-Revilla's running mate. Her announced opponents are former city Business Permits and Licensing Office head Allen Reyes and former municipal councilor and three-term provincial board member Cesario "Jun" Del Rosario Jr., who recently is an editor and deputy chief of reporters at CNN Philippines.

Third District

Imus

Incumbent mayor Emmanuel "Manny" Maliksi is running reelection as a result of an alliance forged between his camp and the camp of his perennial rival, Homer "Saki" Saquilayan, who will instead run for provincial board member. Astillero, a well-known nuisance candidate, is also running for mayor.

Fourth District

Dasmariñas
Incumbent Mayor Jenny Barzaga is term limited and she running in the Congress, her husband Pidi is running, his primary opponents Arnel del Rosario and Jigger "Jigz" Padillo (Nationalist People's Coalition), the two candidates are supporting Rodrigo Duterte (PDP–Laban) and Sen. Grace Poe (Partido Galing at Puso) respectively.

Incumbent Vice Mayor Valeriano Encabo is term limited and running as board member, his party nominated Board Member Rex Mangubat, his opponent is Councilor Jess Frani.

Fifth District

Carmona
Incumbent Mayor Dahlia A. Loyola will running reelection for her last term and is opposed by Rosa Atienza and Jose Carpio.

General Mariano Alvarez

Incumbent Mayor Walter Echevarria Jr will running reelection and is opposed by incumbent vice mayor Percival "Percy" Cabuhat and former mayor Leonisa Joana "Ona" Virata.

Silang

Sixth District

Amadeo

General Trias
Incumbent Mayor Antonio "Ony" Ferrer and Vice Mayor Maurito "Morit" Sison were challenged by Annalyn Jubillo and Reynaldo Parin respectively. As with the previous elections, it ended with a landslide victory for both Ferrer and Sison, and marked the first polls in the newly created city since the 2015 referendum.

Tanza

Trece Martires

Seventh District

Alfonso

General Emilio Aguinaldo

Indang

Magallanes

Maragondon

Mendez (Mendez-Nuñez)
Incumbent Mayor Eric Vida is running unopposed.

Naic
Incumbent Mayor Junio Dualan is running unopposed.

Tagaytay
Both incumbent mayor Agnes Delgado-Tolentino, wife of incumbent 7th District representative Abraham "Bambol" Tolentino and sister-in-law of 2016 senatorial candidate Francis Tolentino, and running mate city councilor Raymond Ambion will be running unopposed.

Ternate

References

2016 Philippine local elections
Elections in Cavite
2016 elections in Calabarzon